Sandra Šarić (born 8 May 1984 in Senj) is a Croatian taekwondo athlete. Representing Croatia at the 2003 World Taekwondo Championships in Garmisch Partenkirchen, Germany, she won the silver medal in the welterweight (-67 kg) division, losing to 2000 Olympic champion Lee Sun-Hee of South Korea in the final. In 2008, she participated in the European Taekwondo Championships in Rome, Italy, and won the gold medal in the middleweight (-72 kg) division.

Šarić represented her country and won the bronze medal in the - 67kg class at the 2008 Beijing Olympics.

References

1984 births
Living people
People from Senj
Croatian female taekwondo practitioners
Olympic bronze medalists for Croatia
Olympic taekwondo practitioners of Croatia
Taekwondo practitioners at the 2004 Summer Olympics
Taekwondo practitioners at the 2008 Summer Olympics
Olympic medalists in taekwondo
Medalists at the 2008 Summer Olympics
European champions for Croatia
European Taekwondo Championships medalists
World Taekwondo Championships medalists
21st-century Croatian women